

See also 
 Lists of fossiliferous stratigraphic units in Europe
 List of fossiliferous stratigraphic units in Denmark

 List of fossiliferous stratigraphic units in Scotland
 List of fossiliferous stratigraphic units in Svalbard
 List of fossiliferous stratigraphic units in Sweden

References

Bibliography 
 
 
  

.

 Norway
Fossiliferous stratigraphic units